Selah is a city in Yakima County, Washington, United States. The population was 8,153 at the 2020 census.

History
Selah was incorporated on March 17, 1919. The Tree Top apple processor co-operative (established in 1960) has its headquarters and two processing plants in Selah. In 2004, the Yakama Tribe bought the old Hi-Country juicing plant, which it operated until 2010. Currently, the facility is owned and operated by Sun-Rype, the U.S. arm of Western Canada's largest juice and fruit snack distributor. It continues to produce store brand apple juice and other beverages. In addition a number of fruit companies have warehouses there, due to the proximity of fruit orchards in the nearby Wenas Valley and access to regional railroad and roadway systems for shipment to markets. Selah and the Wenas Valley increasingly serve as a "bedroom community" of the larger city of Yakima to the south. Because of the nearby orchards and juice processing plants, Selah is often referred to as "The Apple Juice Capital of the World"

Each Memorial Day weekend, the Washington State chapter of the National Audubon Society holds a campout some 22 miles north of Selah at the Hazel Wolf Bird Sanctuary in the upper Wenas Valley near Wenas, Washington. The upper valley also holds Wenas Lake, an irrigation reservoir. Wenas Creek flows from the reservoir through the agricultural lower Wenas Valley. This is where the Wenas Creek Mammoth was found. The creek is a tributary of the Yakima River.

In July 2020, the city was the subject of a New York Times story examining small town reaction to non-violent protests about racial inequality which noted anecdotal evidence of uneven enforcement of laws and rules to people of color.

Geography
Selah is located at  (46.652109, -120.535134).

Climate
This region experiences hot and dry summers, with no average monthly temperatures above 71.6 °F. According to the Köppen Climate Classification system, Selah has a warm-summer Mediterranean climate, abbreviated "Csb" on climate maps.

Demographics

2010 census
As of the census of 2010, there were 7,147 people, 2,658 households, and 1,861 families living in the city. The racial makeup of the city was 85.8% White, 0.5% African American, 1.3% Native American, 0.7% Asian, 0.2% Pacific Islander, 8.4% from other races, and 3.1% from two or more races. Hispanic or Latino of any race were 16.4% of the population.

There were 2,658 households, of which 42.6% had children under the age of 18 living with them, 47.2% were married couples living together, 17.2% had a female householder with no husband present, 5.6% had a male householder with no wife present, and 30.0% were non-families. 24.0% of all households were made up of individuals, and 8.6% had someone living alone who was 65 years of age or older. The average household size was 2.64 and the average family size was 3.12.

The median age in the city was 31.5 years. 29.6% of residents were under the age of 18; 9.5% were between the ages of 18 and 24; 27.9% were from 25 to 44; 22.8% were from 45 to 64; and 10.1% were 65 years of age or older. The gender makeup of the city was 48.2% male and 51.8% female.

2000 census
As of the census of 2000, there were 5,314 people, 2,269 households, and 1,688 families living in the city. The population density was 1,444.2 people per square mile (557.5/km2). There were 2,408 housing units at an average density of 551.1 per square mile (212.8/km2). The racial makeup of the city was 88.42% White, 0.60% African American, 1.22% Native American, 0.82% Asian, 0.08% Pacific Islander, 6.40% from other races, and 2.46% from two or more races. Hispanic or Latino of any race were 11.05% of the population.

There were 2,269 households, out of which 44.3% had children under the age of 18 living with them, 54.4% were married couples living together, 14.5% had a female householder with no husband present, and 25.6% were non-families. 21.7% of all households were made up of individuals, and 8.0% had someone living alone who was 65 years of age or older. The average household size was 2.72 and the average family size was 3.16.

In the city, the age distribution of the population shows 31.7% under the age of 18, 9.3% from 18 to 24, 31.6% from 25 to 44, 18.7% from 45 to 64, and 8.7% who were 65 years of age or older. The median age was 31 years. For every 100 females, there were 96.1 males. For every 100 females age 18 and over, there were 92.5 males.

The median income for a household in the city was $42,386, and the median income for a family was $49,477. Males had a median income of $39,241 versus $28,067 for females. The per capita income for the city was $18,595. About 9.0% of families and 10.4% of the population were below the poverty line, including 13.4% of those under age 18 and 5.1% of those age 65 or over.

References

Further reading
Lince, Robert S. The Selah Story. Selah, Washington: Selah Valley Optimist Printing, 1984.

External links

 City of Selah
 Discover Selah
 Yakima Valley Visitors & Convention Bureau

Cities in Washington (state)
Cities in Yakima County, Washington
Populated places established in 1919
Populated places on the Yakima River